Libanopristis is an extinct genus of ganopristid sclerorhynchoid that lived in Lebanon during the Late Cretaceous.

References

Prehistoric cartilaginous fish genera